Albert Palmer may refer to:

 Albert Palmer (American politician)
 Albert Palmer (Australian politician)
 Albert Palmer (Canadian politician)
 Sir Albert Palmer (judge), Chief Justice of the Solomon Islands
Albert Marshman Palmer, American theatrical manager